The 1963 All-Ireland Senior Hurling Championship Final was the 76th All-Ireland Final and the culmination of the 1963 All-Ireland Senior Hurling Championship, an inter-county hurling tournament for the top teams in Ireland. The match was held at Croke Park, Dublin, on 1 September 1963, between Kilkenny and Waterford. Waterford, the Munster champions, lost to their Leinster opponents on a score line of 4-17 to 6-8.

Match details

All-Ireland Senior Hurling Championship Final
All-Ireland Senior Hurling Championship Final, 1963
All-Ireland Senior Hurling Championship Final
All-Ireland Senior Hurling Championship Finals
Kilkenny GAA matches
Waterford GAA matches